Hasini may  refer to:

Abd al-Rahim al-Hasini, Iraqi politician
Hasini Perera, Sri Lankan cricketer

See also
Hasinai